The Alessandro Volta Power Plant is a 3600 MW polycombustible thermal power plant located in the municipality of Montalto di Castro and owned by Enel.

It was commissioned in 1989 near the unfinished Montalto di Castro Nuclear Power Station of which it used part of the site and the sea water intakes already built.

It is currently scheduled for disposal and is being negotiated for sale and conversion into data centers for IT companies.

Construction 
The plant consists of four 660 MW steam units that can be fired by either dense fuel oil or natural gas, and eight small 120-125 MW Nuovo Pignone (125MW) and Fiat (120MW) turbogas units paired in a combined cycle with the steam units.

It is the most powerful thermal power plant in Italy but is relatively underutilized (about 3000 hours per year out of a theoretical maximum of 8760), due to the high cost of fuel.

Emissions 
In 2009, the plant emitted one million tons of carbon dioxide into the atmosphere, fully offset by the purchase of approximately one million CERs.

Specifically, in order to gain possession of the necessary CERs, Enel has invested in a project in China that involves the destruction of tons of trifluoromethane (also known by the abbreviation HFC-23, it is a very dangerous greenhouse gas). In this way, providing on the one hand the removal of greenhouse gases in China, it comes into possession of credits that allow it to emit an equivalent amount of carbon dioxide in Italy.

See also 
 List of power stations in Italy
 Electricity sector in Italy

References 

Power stations in Italy
Alessandro Volta